This article shows all participating women's volleyball squads at the 2014 Central American and Caribbean Games, held from November 15 to 22, 2014 in Veracruz, Mexico.

Head coach: Mauro Marasciulo

Head coach: Horacio Bastit

Head coach: Juan Gala

Head coach: Marcos Kwiek

Head coach: Jorge Azair

Head coach: José Mieles

Head coach: Drakes Nicholson

Head coach: Sergio Rivero

References

2014
volleyball
Central American and Caribbean Games